NGC 293 is a barred spiral galaxy in the constellation Cetus. It was discovered on September 27, 1864 by Albert Marth.

References

External links
 

0293
18640927
Cetus (constellation)
Barred spiral galaxies
Discoveries by Albert Marth
003195